Pablo Andrés Abdala Kovasevic (born May 6, 1972 in Rosario, Argentina) is a retired Palestinian football midfielder. He is of Palestinian (Abdala) and Croatian (Kovasevic or Kovacevic) origin.

External links

1972 births
Living people
Footballers from Rosario, Santa Fe
Argentine expatriate footballers
Argentine footballers
Argentine people of Palestinian descent
Argentine people of Croatian descent
Argentine emigrants to Palestine
Citizens of the State of Palestine through descent
Palestinian footballers
Palestinian expatriate footballers
Palestine international footballers
Palestinian people of Croatian descent
Association football midfielders
Rosario Central footballers
Cobreloa footballers
Millonarios F.C. players
Universidad de Concepción footballers
Deportes Temuco footballers
Deportes Melipilla footballers
Argentine Primera División players
Categoría Primera A players
Primera B de Chile players
Chilean Primera División players
Expatriate footballers in Chile
Expatriate footballers in Colombia
Argentino de Rosario footballers